Michael M. Luo (born 1976) is an American journalist and current editor of   He previously wrote for The New York Times, where he was an investigative reporter.

Early life
Luo was born in Pittsburgh in 1976. His parents are immigrants from Taiwan. He graduated from Harvard University with a B.A. in government in 1998.

Career
He was a writer for two years for the Associated Press, where he wrote narrative feature stories, and also worked at Newsday, where he was a police reporter on Long Island. Luo also reported for the Los Angeles Times before moving to The New York Times. In 2002, Luo received a George Polk Award for Criminal Justice Reporting and a Livingston Award for Young Journalists "for a series of articles on three poor, [disabled] African-Americans in Alabama who were in prison for killing a baby that probably never existed." The story resulted in the release of two of the three, while the third remained in prison for a separate charge. In 2000, Luo won a T.W. Wang Award for Excellence for journalism on Chinese-American topics.

Luo joined The New York Times in September 2003 at the metropolitan desk. According to the Times, Luo "has written about economics and the recession as a national correspondent; covered the 2008 presidential campaign and the 2010 midterm elections; and done stints in Washington and in the Baghdad bureau." Luo wrote a viral piece about a woman who accosted him for being a Chinese American in October 2016.

He has since gone to edit investigations at the New Yorker and was eventually promoted to manage its entire digital presence.

References

External links

Articles by Michael Luo from The New Yorker
Articles by Michael Luo from The New York Times

1976 births
Living people
Harvard University alumni
American male journalists
American investigative journalists
George Polk Award recipients
The New York Times writers
Writers from Pittsburgh
Newsday people
American journalists of Chinese descent
American people of Taiwanese descent
Livingston Award winners for Local Reporting